Yi-kyung, also spelled Lee-kyung, is a Korean unisex given name, predominantly feminine. Due to North–South differences in the Korean language, in North Korea some of these names start with an "r" (ㄹ) in both spoken and written form, which does not occur in word-initial position in Korean as spoken in the South. There are 35 hanja with the reading "yi", 26 hanja with the reading "ri", and 54 hanja with the reading "kyung" on the South Korean government's official list of hanja which may be registered for use in given names.

People with this name include:
Chun Lee-kyung (born 1976), South Korean short track speed skater
Kwak Yi-kyong (born 1979), South Korean LGBT rights activist
Lee Yi-kyung (born 1989), South Korean male actor
Woo Yi-kyung (우이경; born 1987), South Korean pop singer

Fictional characters with this name include:
Han Yi-kyung, in 2005 South Korean television series Only You
Han Yi-kyung, in 2007 South Korean television series Air City 
Song Yi-kyung, in 2011 South Korean television series 49 Days
Jin Yi-kyung, in 2015 South Korean television series Angry Mom
Seo Yi-kyung, in South Korean Netflix adaptation Sweet Home (TV series)

See also
List of Korean given names
Kim Yik-yung (김익영, born 1935), South Korean ceramic artist
Jeong Yi-kyeong (정의경, born 1985), South Korean handball player, whose given name is spelled Ui-gyeong in Revised Romanisation

References

Korean unisex given names